The 2016–17 Bowling Green Falcons women's basketball team will represent Bowling Green State University during the 2016–17 NCAA Division I women's basketball season. The Falcons, led by fifth year head coach Jennifer Roos, play their home games at the Stroh Center as members of the East Division of the Mid-American Conference.

Schedule

|-
!colspan=9 style="background:#F15C26; color:white;"| Non-conference regular season

|-
!colspan=9 style="background:#F15C26; color:white;"| MAC regular season

|-
!colspan=9 style="background:#F15C26; color:white;"| MAC Tournament

See also
2016–17 Bowling Green Falcons men's basketball team

References

Bowling Green
Bowling Green Falcons women's basketball seasons